The IndyCar Rookie of the Year Award is presented to the first-year driver that has the best season in a IndyCar Series season.

The following lists compiling all the winners of the Rookie of the Year Award in open wheel American Championship Car Racing from 1946 season to the present day. Before the creation of Championship Auto Racing Teams the prize is not officially awarded. So all of the AAA and USAC winners of the Rookie of the Year award is not officially recognized.

As of 2022 IndyCar Season a driver is a Rookie Driver in the IndyCar Series if the driver has:
A) not participated in more than four (4) IndyCar Series races in a Racing Season or 
B) participated in less than eight (8) IndyCar Series races in his/her career.

The list of "Indy car", "Champ car" or "IndyCar" rookies under the following auspices:

American Automobile Association Contest Board (1946–1955)
United States Automobile Club (1956–1980)
Championship Auto Racing Teams (1979–2007)
Indy Racing League/IndyCar Series (1997–present)

Sanctioning bodies

The AAA Contest Board began sanctioning races as early as 1904. In the early years of the sport, only two seasons (1905 and 1916) an official national championship was recognized and awarded.
The 1946 season is a source of a statistical anomaly. The AAA Contest Board included a substantial number of "Big Car" races in the national championship for 1946, swelling the season to 77 events (6 Champ Car races and 71 Big Car races). Some later texts chose to dismiss the 71 Big Car races from record, but reliable records and historians contend that the season should be regarded as the full 77-race schedule.
Officially, Jim Trueman Rookie of the Year Award named after the late founder of the two-time champion TrueSports Racing Team, it was presented from 1979 Season to 2007 Season to the rookie who accumulates the most Champ Car Championship Series points among first year drivers.

Rookie of the Year winners

AAA and USAC Rookie of the Year winners

CART Jim Trueman Rookie of the Year winners
The Rookie of the Year award in CART was named in the honor of Jim Trueman.

IndyCar Series Rookie of the Year winners
As of 2018 IndyCar Series season The Rookie of the Year Award is presented to the top-finishing rookie in the IndyCar Series Drivers point standings. Winner also receives a $50,000 bonus. The Rookie of the Year Award is based on points for the IndyCar Series Drivers' Championship earned at each event.

Notes
Due to sanctioning body splits in the sport of American Open Wheel racing from 1979 to 2007, several years saw two separate Rookie of the Year Award winners for separately sanctioned championship circuits.
Because of the sanctioning body split, Indy Racing League officials in 2003 did not consider Scott Dixon (Champion), Tony Kanaan (4th), or Toranosuke Takagi (10th) as rookies.  However, by 2007, with a new Champ Car formula and elimination of ovals, League officials declared subsequent 2006 and 2007 rookie candidates rookies because they lacked oval experience.
In 2008 IndyCar Season Will Power was considered a rookie. That year he won the Toyota Grand Prix of Long Beach, but that race was run under Champ Car rules and he become the last ever winner of a Champ Car-style race. Power`s rookie year in Champ Car was 2006 as he won the Rookie of the Year award that season, so in 2008 Toyota Grand Prix of Long Beach Power did not have a rookie status for that race.

IndyCar Rookie winners

Drivers Who Won Their First Race With a New Team

References

External links
IndyCar.com – Official site
ChampCarStats.com

See also

Indianapolis 500 Rookie of the Year
List of Indianapolis 500 winners

 
 
American Championship Car winners
Rookie of the Year Winners